Fabio Valguarnera (born 7 March 1967) is an Italian wrestler. He competed in the men's Greco-Roman 130 kg at the 1988 Summer Olympics.

References

1967 births
Living people
Italian male sport wrestlers
Olympic wrestlers of Italy
Wrestlers at the 1988 Summer Olympics
Sportspeople from Palermo